Reiskirchen is a municipality in the district of Gießen, in Hesse, Germany and is located 11 km east of Gießen.

References

Giessen (district)